Coral dermatitis is a cutaneous condition caused by injury from the exoskeleton of certain corals.

See also 
 Skin lesion

References 

Parasitic infestations, stings, and bites of the skin
Invertebrate attacks